Dipodium elegans is an orchid species that is native to Sumatra in Indonesia. The species was formally described in 1900 by Dutch botanist Johannes Jacobus Smith.

References

External links 

elegans
Orchids of Indonesia
Plants described in 1900